This is a list of fellows of the Royal Society elected in 1708.

Fellows
 Charles Nicholas Ayres (fl. 1708)
 Robert Balle (d. 1733)
 John Bridges (1666–1724)
 Francesco Cornaro (1670–1734)
 William Fellowes (fl. 1708)
 Richard Foley (1681–1732)
 Thomas Grey, 2nd Earl of Stamford (1654–1720)
 David Hamilton (1663–1721)
 Archibald Hutcheson (c. 1660–1740)
 Jean Rodolphe Lavater (fl. 1704–1716)
 Edward Lawrence (d. 1725)
 Edward Lhuyd (1660–1709)
 George Markham (1666–1736)
 Thomas Milles (1671–1740)
 Benjamin Pratt (d. 1715)
 Philip Stanhope, 2nd Earl of Chesterfield (1633–1713)
 Richard Tighe (1678–1736)
 Michelangelo Tilli (1655–1740)
 Thomas Whalley (fl. 1708)
 Thomas Woodford (d. 1759)

References

1708
1708 in science
1708 in England